NCSA HTTPd is an early, now discontinued, web server originally developed at the NCSA at the University of Illinois at Urbana–Champaign by Robert McCool and others. First released in 1993, it was among the earliest web servers developed, following Tim Berners-Lee's CERN httpd, Tony Sanders' Plexus server, and some others. It was for some time the natural counterpart to the Mosaic web browser in the client–server World Wide Web. It also introduced the Common Gateway Interface, allowing for the creation of dynamic websites.

After Robert McCool left NCSA in mid-1994, the development of NCSA HTTPd slowed greatly. An independent effort, the Apache project, took the codebase and continued; meanwhile, NCSA released one more version (1.5), then ceased development. In August 1995, NCSA HTTPd powered most of all web servers on the Internet; nearly all of them quickly switched over to Apache. By April 1996, Apache passed NCSA HTTPd as the No. 1 server on the Internet, and retained that position until mid-to-late 2016.

See also 
 Comparison of web server software
 National Center for Supercomputing Applications

References

External links 
 The NCSA HTTPd homepage
 The NCSA HTTPd Home Page (a mirror site of the official one) 
 NCSA software and technologies (with HTTPd mentioned)
 The NCSA HTTPd homepage on the Internet Archive (as of 2007-10-29)
 NCSA HTTPd source code (NCSA source code on GitHub)

Free web server software
Web server software